The 1951 Maryland State Hawks football team was an American football team that represented Maryland State College (now known as University of Maryland Eastern Shore) during the 1951 college football season. In their third season under head coach Vernon McCain, the team compiled an 7–1 record. Maryland State sole loss came on October 13 against , which snapped a 26-game winning streak dating back to the 1948 season.

Schedule

References

Maryland State
Maryland Eastern Shore Hawks football seasons
Maryland State Hawks football